Joan Faye Boyar (born 1955, also published as Joan Boyar Plumstead) is an American and Danish computer scientist whose research interests include online algorithms, cryptology, and the computational complexity of the Boolean functions used in cryptology. She is a professor in the Department of Mathematics and Computer Science at the University of Southern Denmark.

Early life and education
Boyar was born in Chicago on 18 April 1955, and majored in mathematics at the University of Chicago, graduating in 1977. She went to the University of California, Berkeley for graduate study in computer science, earning a master's degree in 1981 and completing her Ph.D. in 1983. Her doctoral dissertation, Inferring Sequences Produced by Pseudo-Random Number Generators, was supervised by Manuel Blum.

Career and later life
After completing her doctorate, Boyar returned to the University of Chicago as an assistant professor of computer science in 1983. Her students there included Danish computer scientist Carsten Lund, jointly advised with Lance Fortnow and László Babai.

From 1989 to 1992, Boyar began a sequence of short-term and visiting positions, at Aarhus University in Denmark, Loyola University Chicago, and Odense University in Denmark, before obtaining a position as lektor (associate professor) at the University of Southern Denmark in 1992.  She was promoted to full professor in 2017. She is married to Kim Skak Larsen, also a professor of computer science at the University of Southern Denmark, and is a Danish citizen.

References

External links
Home page

1955 births
Living people
Academics from Chicago
American emigrants to Denmark
American computer scientists
American women computer scientists
Danish computer scientists
Danish women computer scientists
Academic staff of the University of Southern Denmark
University of Chicago alumni
University of California, Berkeley alumni
University of Chicago faculty